Islamic Laws is a comprehensive book (risalah) on Islamic jurisprudence (fiqh) by the Iraqi Grand Ayatollah Ali al-Sistani, published and translated by World Federation of KSI Muslim Communities.

See also
List of Shi'a books

References

External links
Full text

Shia fiqh